Rey Muerto is a 12-minute fictional live-action short film written and directed by Argentine filmmaker Lucrecia Martel and released 19 May 1995. It was included in Historias breves I ("Short Stories I"), the first edition of the INCAA competition, which was fundamental to the rise and recognition of the generation of Argentine filmmakers known variously as Cine Independiente Argentino or Nuevo Cine Argentino ("new" or "independent" Argentine film).

This film and other winners of a 1994 Argentine National Institute of Cinema and Audiovisual Arts short film contest were brought together to form the feature-length Historias breves, released 19 May 1995.

Synopsis 

The story takes place in the fictional village of Rey Muerto ("Dead King") in northeastern Argentina. A woman tries to escape a husband who has been treating her badly, bringing her three children with her.

Cast 
 Roly Serrano
 Sandra Ceballos
 Marcelo Machuca
 Carlos Aldana
 Lía Crucet

Technical team 
Cinematography: Esteban Sapir 
Wardrobe: Alejandra Crespo 
Montage: Fernanda Rossi 
Music: Laura Ruggiero 
Sound: Horacio Almada 
Production assistant: Alejandro Arroz 
Set design: Alejandra Crespo 
Scenography: Alejandra Crespo 
Wardrobe design: Alejandra Crespo

Reviews 
Reviewers of Historias breves wrote:

Alejandro Ricagno in El Amante del Cine writew: 
Claudio España in La Nación gices the opinion that:
Rafael Granado in Clarín said:
Manrupe and Portela add:

Notes

References

External links 
 

Argentine short films
1994 short films
1994 films
1990s Spanish-language films